The 1977 Ottawa Rough Riders finished in 2nd place in the Eastern Conference with an 8–8 record. Richard Holmes became the first player in CFL history to rush for 1,000 yards with two different teams. He rushed for 1016 yards while playing for the Argonauts and the Ottawa Rough Riders.

Preseason

Regular season

Standings

Schedule

Postseason

Player stats

Passing

Receiving

Rushing

Awards and honours
 CFL's Most Outstanding Canadian Award – Tony Gabriel (TE)
 Tom Clements, All-Eastern Quarterback
 Tony Gabriel, Tight End, CFL All-Star
 Jeff Turcotte, Guard, CFL All-Star
 Mike Widger, Linebacker, CFL All-Star

References

Ottawa Rough Riders seasons
1977 Canadian Football League season by team